Anticarsia irrorata, the owl moth, is a species of moth in the family Noctuidae. It is native to the Old World tropics.

Description

Its wingspan is about 40–46 mm. Palpi with third joint rather shorter than in the typical section. Male lack tufts on tibia. Hindwings with normal neuration in male, with no fold in inner margin. Antennae of male with bristles and cilia. It is light brownish with darker areas distally. The forewing is marked with a diagonal line and a row of black dots. The hindwing has similar markings. The underside has lighter, brownish dots and a white spot. The larva is light green. It has a dorsal line which is dark green with a yellowish center, and wider, spotted lines on either side. The spiracles are white with black edges. It moves in a looping motion.

Ecology
Common food plants include species from many legume genera, including Cajanus, Cicer, Cyamopsis, Glycine, Lablab, Mucuna, Phaseolus, and Vigna. It has also been noted on the melon genus Cucumis, and grasses such as Andropogon, Oryza, Paspalum, and Saccharum.

References

Catocalinae
Moths described in 1781
Moths of Africa
Moths of Cape Verde
Moths of the Comoros
Moths of Asia
Moths of Japan
Moths of Madagascar
Moths of Mauritius
Moths of New Zealand
Moths of Réunion
Moths of São Tomé and Príncipe
Moths of Seychelles
Moths of the Middle East